The 2021–22 UEFA Women's Champions League knockout phase started on 22 March 2022 with the quarter-finals and ended with the final on 21 May 2022 at the Juventus Stadium in Turin, Italy, to decide the champions of the 2021–22 UEFA Women's Champions League. A total of 8 teams will compete in the knockout phase.

Qualified teams
The knockout phase involved the eight teams which qualified as winners and runners-up of each of the four groups in the group stage.

Schedule
The schedule of the competition was as follows (all draws were held at the UEFA headquarters in Nyon, Switzerland).

Bracket

Quarter-finals

The draw for the quarter-finals was held on 20 December 2021.

Summary

The first legs were played on 22 and 23 March, and the second legs on 30 and 31 March 2022.

|}

Matches

Paris Saint-Germain won 4–3 on aggregate.

Lyon won 4–3 on aggregate.

VfL Wolfsburg won 3–1 on aggregate.

Barcelona won 8–3 on aggregate.

Semi-finals

The draw for the semi-finals was held on 20 December 2021 (after the quarter-final draw).

Summary

The first legs were played from 22 and 24 April and the second legs on 30 April 2022. Barcelona's home quarter- and semi-finals (91,553 and 91,648) were the largest known attendances for women's football since the 1971 Women's World Cup, where Mexico–Denmark drew 110,000 spectators at the Estadio Azteca in Mexico.

|}

Matches

Barcelona won 5–3 on aggregate.

Lyon won 5–3 on aggregate.

Final

The final was played on 21 May 2022 at Juventus Stadium, Turin. A draw was held on 20 December 2021, (after the quarter-final and semi-final draws), to determine which semi-final winner would be designated as the "home" team for administrative purposes.

References

External links

UEFA Women's Champions League Matches: 2021–22, UEFA.com

2
March 2022 sports events in Europe
April 2022 sports events in Europe
May 2022 sports events in Europe